Sean Silver (born March 29, 1990) is a Namibian cricketer. Silver made his cricketing debut for Namibia Under-19s in 2007, when he played against Kenya in the Africa Under-19 Championship.

His debut saw him open with former Namibian Under-15s and Under-17s captain Raymond van Schoor, though he was bowled out by young Kenyan bowler Elijah Otieno. The Namibian team were to improve on this early form, coming back with wins over the other two teams in their pool, with Silver making a century in the final preliminary match against Ghana, thus leading Namibia into the semi-finals.

Silver continued his impressive form in the semi-finals, once again scoring a century against Uganda, and completing a 168-run opening partnership with van Schoor, whose father Melt retired from cricket in 2005. Silver hit a half-century in the final to assist Namibia to a win in the tournament.

Having had such good form in the youth competition, it was only a matter of time before he stepped up to play for the senior team, for whom he made his first-class debut on October 18, 2007, in a three-day match.

References

External links
Sean Silver at CricketArchive 

1990 births
Sportspeople from Swakopmund
Namibian cricketers
Living people